Oligoryzomys andinus, also known as the Andean colilargo or Andean pygmy rice rat, is a species of rodent in genus Oligoryzomys of family Cricetidae. It is found in the Andes of southern Peru and western Bolivia, but may in fact include more than one species. Its karyotype has 2n = 60 and FNa = 70.

References

Literature cited

Weksler, M., Zeballos, H. and Bernal, N. 2008. . In IUCN. IUCN Red List of Threatened Species. Version 2009.2. <www.iucnredlist.org>. Downloaded on November 27, 2009.

Oligoryzomys
Mammals described in 1914
Taxa named by Wilfred Hudson Osgood
Taxonomy articles created by Polbot